The commune of Matana is a commune of Bururi Province in south-western Burundi. The capital lies at Matana.

References

Communes of Burundi
Bururi Province

→Mugano, Gatabo, Muzi, kabingo.<were skipped before maybe the researcher didn't visit them. they are subdivisions of matana commune